Naan Adimai Illai is a 1986 Indian Tamil-language romantic drama film directed by Dwarakish. The film stars Rajinikanth and Sridevi. This was the last Tamil film for Sridevi in 1980s who then concentrated on her Bollywood career, though she would later return to Tamil cinema in the 2010s. Naan Adimai Illai ran for 75 days in all major cities and was a disaster at the box office. The film was a remake of the Hindi film Pyar Jhukta Nahin (1985).

Plot 
Vijay is a professional photographer from a middle-class background, who falls in love with a rich girl, Priya, whose father is Rajasekhar, a class-conscious man. They are stubborn in their love and marry against her parents' wishes. But soon the marriage is on the rocks due to the difference in their backgrounds, with the wily Rajasekhar playing his cards very well to split his daughter from Vijay. They have a fight and Priya goes back to her parents' house and Rajasekhar coerces her to file for divorce from Vijay.  After a few days, Priya visits the doctor for a stomach-ache and learns that she is pregnant. An elated Priya is ready to mend fences with Vijay and wants to tell him the news, but is blocked by her dad who has fixed her remarriage with someone else. She gives her dad the slip and goes to Vijay's house, just to find out that he vacated the place recently.

Later Vijay is in a hospital to visit his friend and Priya is brought to the same hospital with labour pains. Vijay is thrilled and tries to talk to Priya, but Rajasekhar tells Vijay that he will give him the baby on the condition that he promises he will never see Priya again and Vijay agrees. Priya gives birth to a son and Vijay takes him away. Priya's father tells her that the baby was stillborn. She is dejected and loses her mental balance and thinks that her son is still alive. Vijay brings up his son away from Priya's family. Many years later, Priya who is seriously depressed and always carries a doll assuming it to be her son, is unknowingly brought by her parents close to where Vijay lives and gets acquainted with a boy in the neighbourhood. The boy turns out to be her son and he leads Priya to Vijay.

Cast 
Rajinikanth as Vijay
Sridevi as Priya
Girish Karnad as Rajasekhar
V. K. Ramasamy as R.K.S
Manorama as Rajamma
S. N. Parvathy as Maid
LIC Narasimhan as Friend of rajasekhar
Y Gee Mahendran
Master Arjun as Kannan/son of vijay
Pushpalatha as Nanny
Senthamarai as Shankar
K. Vijaya as Priya's mother

Production 
Naan Adimai Illai is a remake of the Hindi film Pyar Jhukta Nahin (1985). Rajinikanth wanted Sridevi in the film, and she accepted instantly. Director and producer Dwarakish, who also produced the Kannada version Nee Bareda Kadambari (1985), noted the difficulty in obtaining her dates because "her call sheet was similar to that of a superstar". It was her final appearance in a Tamil film before she concentrated on her Bollywood career, though she would later return in the 2010s. She had played the same role in the Telugu version Pachani Kapuram (1985).

Soundtrack 
Soundtrack was composed by Vijay Anand. The song "Oru Jeevan Thaan" is based on Misra Sivaranjani raga.

Reception 
Kalki criticised the film's second half, saying it looked like the film was stumbling without knowing how to take the story forward.

References

External links 

1980s Tamil-language films
1986 films
1986 romantic drama films
Films directed by Dwarakish
Indian romantic drama films
Tamil remakes of Hindi films